Mokowe is a small town in Kenya's Lamu County in what was previously Coast Province.

Location
The coordinates of Mokowe are 2°14'12.0"S, 40°51'18.0"E (Latitude:-2.236663; Longitude:40.854991).

Overview
The main health facility is Mokowe Health Centre. The town also has a post office, a police station, a branch of Kenya Commercial Bank and a branch of Postbank Kenya.

See also
List of roads in Kenya

References

Populated places in Lamu County
Lamu